Paola Florencia Carosella (born October 30, 1972) is an Italian Argentine cook, businesswoman, executive and celebrity chef currently based in Brazil.

Biography 
Paola was born in Argentina, the only daughter of a middle-class family. Her paternal and maternal grandparents are both from Italy. Her father, the Italian Roberto Carosella, was a photographer and racing driver, while her mother, Irma Polverari, built a successful career as a lawyer.

She was introduced to the kitchen by her grandmothers, who planted and harvested the foods to be prepared; after finishing the equivalent to high school in the country, she began working in restaurants in Buenos Aires. Paola used to work at MasterChef Brazil as a juror alongside Brazilian Henrique Fogaça and French chef Érick Jacquin, being replaced by Brazilian chef Helena Rizzo.

On November 7, 2016, Paola released her first book which is a mix of autobiography and a collection of recipes, called "Todas as sextas" (Every Friday).

She has a daughter named Francesca (born 2011), from a previous relationship.

Gastronomic career 
She worked with Argentine chef Francis Mallmann before traveling to Paris and working in restaurants such as Le Grand Véfour, Le Celadon and Le Bristol. She even worked as a cook in restaurants in California, the United States, and Uruguay, before moving to Mendoza, Argentina, in 1994, and working at the Patagonia West restaurant in New York City.

A Figueira Rubaiyat 
In 2001, she was invited to move to São Paulo, Brazil, to open and direct the kitchen of the restaurant A Figueira Rubaiyat, along with Francis Mallmann and Belarmino Fernandez Iglesias.

Restaurants 
2001 - A Figueira Rubaiyat
2003 - Julia Cocina
2008 - Arturito
2014 - La Guapa

Awards 
 2009: Chief revelation in Gula magazine
 2009: Best Varied Restaurant in Veja Magazine
 2010: Chef of the year in Veja magazine
 2010: Best Varied Restaurant in Veja Magazine
 2014: Best Chef of the year by Guia da Folha
 2016/2017: Best Salgado in Veja São Paulo Eating & Drinking

References

External links
 

1972 births
Living people
People from Buenos Aires
Argentine people of Italian descent
Argentine businesspeople
Argentine chefs
Argentine restaurateurs
Women restaurateurs
Argentine writers
Argentine expatriates in Brazil
Argentine emigrants to Brazil